Mru, also known as Mrung (Murung), is a Sino-Tibetan language of Bangladesh and Myanmar. It is spoken by a community of Mrus (Mros) inhabiting the Chittagong Hill Tracts of Bangladesh with a population of 22,000 according to the 1991 census, and in Rakhine State, Myanmar. The Mrus are the second-largest tribal group in Bandarban District of the Chittagong Hill Tracts. A small group of Mros also live in Rangamati Hill District.

Classification
Mru forms the Mruic language branch with Hkongso and Anu, which are spoken in Paletwa Township, Chin State, Myanmar. The position of Mruic with Sino-Tibetan is unclear.

Distribution

The Mros live in forest areas of Lama, Ruma, Alikaram, and Thanchi near Chimbuk Mountain of Bandarban District, Bangladesh (Rashel 2009). In Myanmar, they also live in Buthidaung Township and Ponnagyun Township in Sittwe District (Akiab), Rakhine State.

Subdivisions
Ethnologue (22nd edition) lists 3 main dialects as Anok, Dowpreng (Dopreng), and Sungma (Tshungma), as well as the 2 minor dialects of Domrong and Rumma.
Anok: largest and central
Tshungma: in the north
Domrong: in the lowlands north of the Matamuri
Dopreng: in far south and into Arakan
Rumma: in far south and into Arakan

There are five Mru dialects according to Ebersole (1996).
Anawk
Süngma
Dopreng
Tamsa
Rengmitsa

There are five major Mro clans (Rashel 2009).
Dengua
Premsang
Kongloi
Maizer
Ganaroo Gnar

Rashel (2009) also lists another classification scheme which lists ten Mro clans.
Yarua (subdivisions below)
Khatpo
Chimlung
Zongnow
Sangkan
Chawla
Ngaringcha
Tang
Deng
Kough 
Tam-tu-chah
Kanbak
Prenju
Naichah
Yomore
Rum/Rumthu

Grammar
Unlike the Kuki-Chin languages, Mru has SVO (subject-verb-object) word order (Ebersole 1996).

Phonology

Consonants 

/s/ can also be heard as [ʃ].

Vowels

Numerals
Rashel (2009:159) lists the following Mro numerals.
lok
pre
sum
tle
tnga
trok
rinit
riyat
tako
homod

Script

The Mru script is an indigenous, messianic script: In the 1980s Menlay Murang (also known as Manley Mro) created the religion of Khrama (or Crama) and with it a new script for the Mru language.

The script is written from left to right and has its own set of digits. It does not use tone marks.

The Mru language is written in both the Latin and Mru scripts.

Unicode

The Mru alphabet was added to the Unicode Standard in June, 2014 with the release of version 7.0.

The Unicode block for the Mru script, called Mro, is U+16A40–U+16A6F:

See also
 Mru word list (Wiktionary)

References

 Ebersole, Harold. 1996. The Mru Language: A preliminary grammatical sketch. Ms.
 Peterson, David A., "Where does Mru fit into Tibeto-Burman?", The 42nd International Conference on Sino-Tibetan Languages and Linguistics (ICSTLL 42), November 2009, Payap University, Chiangmai, Thailand. Cf. p. 14.
 Rashel, Md Mostafa (2009). "Morphosyntactic Analysis of Mro Language." Dhaka University Journal of Linguistics, Vol, 2, No, 3, February 2009, 141–160.

Further reading 
 Clifton, John M. 2009. "Orthography development as an ongoing collaborative process: lessons from Bangladesh". 1st International Conference on Language Documentation and Conservation (ICLDC)
 Mru word list (Luce 1985)
 Mru word list (Matisoff 1987)
https://aksharamukha.appspot.com/describe/Mro Many languages able translate to Mro language.
https://keymanweb.com/?_ga=2.244017925.1829076129.1590300131-764973306.1590300131 Used to example for Mro keyboard font.

Languages of Bangladesh
Sino-Tibetan languages
Endangered Sino-Tibetan languages